Péter Máté (born 2 December 1984) is a Hungarian former professional footballer who played as a defender.

Club career
Máté was born in Püspökladány, Hungary and started his career at his local football club, Tünet SE. His talents were spotted by the scouts of Debreceni Focisuli, where he spent the rest of his youth career.

He started football at senior level at Debreceni VSC, where he played two league matches in his first season, and one in his second. In his third season, he played 11 matches scoring one goal.  Since he had few opportunities to play at senior level in 2004, he was sent on loan to Miskolc to play for Diósgyőri VTK. There he played 26 matches scoring two goals.  This performance was good enough to convince the Debrecen board and coaching staff, so at the end of the season he returned to Debrecen. In the 2005–06 season, he played 25 matches scoring five goals, a good return for a centre back.

Máté started the 2006–07 season at Debrecen, but the club received an offer from FA Premier League club Reading, and loaned him out on a season-long loan, making his debut and scoring a header against Darlington in the League Cup. However, Máté had little opportunity to impress on the pitch due to a serious injury he suffered in a reserve match against Chelsea. Reading agreed to fund his rehabilitation, and on 4 May 2007 Máté's loan was extended to the end of 2007.

On 26 August 2010, Máté came on as a last-minute substitute in the 2:1 away win against Bulgarian side Litex Lovech in a UEFA Europa League game. Subsequently, the team from Lovech launched an official complaint, demanding a 3:0 win by default, as Máté had not been entered on the official squad list of the Hungarian team prior to the game. However, UEFA decided against changing the result of the match, settling for a fine of 15,000 euros to be paid by the Hungarians.

Club statistics

Updated to games played as of 7 December 2014.

International career
Máté has been capped by both the Hungary U21 and senior Hungary teams.

References

External links
Péter Máté profile at readingfc.co.uk

1984 births
Living people
People from Püspökladány
Hungarian footballers
Hungary under-21 international footballers
Association football central defenders
Debreceni VSC players
Diósgyőri VTK players
Reading F.C. players
Szolnoki MÁV FC footballers
Nemzeti Bajnokság I players
Hungarian expatriate footballers
Expatriate footballers in England
Hungarian expatriate sportspeople in England
Sportspeople from Hajdú-Bihar County
Nyíregyháza Spartacus FC players
Nemzeti Bajnokság II players